The 2021 Nobel Prize in Literature was awarded to the Tanzanian-born British novelist Abdulrazak Gurnah (born 1948) who the Swedish Academy members praised "for his uncompromising and compassionate penetration of the effects of colonialism and the fate of the refugee in the gulf between cultures and continents." The winner was announced on October 7, 2021, by Mats Malm, permanent secretary of the Swedish Academy.

He is the second black African writer to win the prize since 1986 laureate Wole Soyinka, and the 4th black writer since 1993 laureate Toni Morrison. He also is the 13th British writer and the 6th writer from Africa (including Doris Lessing who was born in Zimbabwe) to become a Nobel laureate in Literature.

Laureate

Gurnah was born to a Muslim family of Yemeni descent in the Sultanate of Zanzibar (present Tanzania. During his teenage years, a coup in 1964 overthrew the Arab rulers on the island that led to a political upheaval and the persecution of Arab citizens in the following years. To escape the dangers, he left his country at the age of 18, becoming a refugee in England, arriving in 1968. There he obtained British citizenship and became professor of english and postcolonial literature. He authored a number of novels which includes Paradise (1994), By the Sea (2001), Desertion (2005), and Afterlives (2020), all of which depict a culturally diversified East Africa specifically highlighting the refugee's disruption and plight in immigration and during colonization.

Reactions

Personal reactions
Interviewed by Adam Smith, Chief Scientific Officer of Nobel Prize Outreach, Gurnah confided that he initially "thought it was a prank". Saying further: "because, you know, these things are usually floated for weeks beforehand, or sometimes months beforehand, about who will the, you know, who are the runners as it were, so it’s not something that was in my mind at all. I was just thinking 'I wonder who'll get it'." Asked how does he see the divisions between cultures and the current refugee crisis based on the prize's citation, he responded:

International reactions

Literary critics and societies were stunned when the Swedish Academy awarded the prize to Gurnah who they described was quite unknown and whose novels are unheard or little read. His announcement came as an "obscure event." Before the announcement, Gurnah was also not included in the 2021 Ladbrokes odds and never labeled as a frontrow contender for the prize. Questions were raised as to whether his selection was still in lieu with Nobel's will that the prize be awarded to an author who "in the field of literature, produced the most outstanding work in an idealistic direction". Gurnah himself even thought the announcement was a prank. It was instead believed that perrennial contender Ngũgĩ wa Thiong'o, a Kenyan academic and author who served also as Gurnah's professor in African literature, would be the rightful recipient for the 2021 Nobel prize. 

Following the announcement, numerous African authors, artists, and journalists praised the choice and warmly congratulated him. Nigerian Wole Soyinka, the first African laureate in 1986, commented on the news by saying: 

Rwandan-French author Scholastique Mukasonga, who is often mentioned as a contender for the Nobel prize, commented with the following statement: 

Gurnah's editor Alexandra Pringle at Bloomsbury said she was thrilled for him to get the recognition that, it seemed, he had been long denied. She describes him as a writer "as important as Chinua Achebe with a writing style that was particularly beautiful and grave and also humorous and kind and sensitive." While author Giles Foden has called Gurnah "one of Africa's greatest living writers". Author Ben Okri commented on his win, saying: "A wonderful moment for Africa, for literature, and for black people. Gurnah has been writing with quiet force since the eighties. Very proud of his achievement." Kenyan academic Mũkoma wa Ngũgĩ also congratulated him saying, 

Before winning the award, his writing had not achieved the same commercial success of other Nobel winners. Asked to comment on why there had been so few Black Nobel Prize winners for literature, Gurnah noted that "the exclusion of non-European people from certain kinds of recognitions, or the exclusion of women from certain kinds of recognitions, is only just now beginning to become an issue or a thing people are concerned to put right", and said that the world was changing.

Award ceremony

Nobel lecture
Unable to participate in the December award ceremony in Stockholm, due to the COVID-19 pandemic restrictions, Gurnah's Nobel lecture entitled "Writing" was broadcast from London. In his lecture, he discussed his earliest memories of reading and writing as well as how his observations of colonization and immigration influenced his desire to write. He, joining the roster of laureates which includes Harold Pinter, Doris Lessing and Toni Morrison, made clear that "writing cannot be just about battling and polemics, however invigorating and comforting that can be." As summary to his lecture, he described writing in the following manner:

Prize presentation
Nobel Committee member Ellen Mattson delivering the presentation speech at Stockholm on December 10, 2021, said the following state about Gurnah:

Ceremonial presentation in London
Gurnah received his Nobel Prize medal and diploma from Ambassador Mikaela Kumlin Granit during a simple ceremonial presentation at the Swedish Ambassador's Residence in London, United Kingdom on December 6, 2021. Dr. Bashir Abu-Manneh, Head of the university's School of English, said: "It is right that Professor Gurnah is being awarded the Nobel Prize for Literature... and recognized for a literary craft that is infused by humanity’s common pursuit of justice. This is the story of our times, and Professor Gurnah has been telling it for decades."

Nobel Committee
The Swedish Academy's Nobel Committee for the 2021 Nobel Prize in Literature are the following members:

References

External links
2021 Price announcement nobelprize.org
Award Ceremony speech nobelprize.org
Abdulrazak Gurnah – Nobel lecture nobelprize.org
The Nobel Prize Award Ceremony 2021 nobelprize.org

2021
2021 awards